Sree Ernakulathappan College of Engineering and Management is a private engineering college situated in Inchakundu, Thrissur District of Kerala, India. The college is affiliated to All India Council for Technical Education (AICTE) New Delhi, and the University of Calicut.

References

Engineering colleges in Thrissur district
All India Council for Technical Education
Colleges affiliated with the University of Calicut